One Voice Mixed Chorus is an LGBTQ choral organization in the Twin Cities of Minneapolis-Saint Paul, United States.

One Voice Mixed Chorus unites gay, lesbian, bisexual, transgender people and straight allies to build community by raising their voices in song. It is one of the largest LGBT choruses in North America, the 100 singing members range from ages 17 to 75, and the “Fifth Section” boasts more than 50 non-singing volunteers. They perform in schools, at community events, and on stage for marquee concerts. Under the direction of Artistic Director Jane Ramseyer Miller, the award-winning chorus described by Chorus America as “one of the region’s best ensembles” has performed for thousands of people throughout the Twin Cities, Greater Minnesota and beyond.

History
One Voice Mixed Chorus gave its debut concert in 1989, making it one of the first choruses to bring together people from the LGBTQ communities in the region.  The chorus was founded in 1988 by Minnesota native Paul Petrella.

Performances and music
One Voice Mixed Chorus performs 20 to 30 events annually.  Two major concerts are held in January and June of each year.  The chorus also conducts an annual outreach tour (often in greater Minnesota), and a series of workshops and concerts in Twin Cities middle and high-schools. The annual fundraiser, Spring Fever, is held in April.

Their concert themes have included messages about LGBT life experiences, humor within our community, safe sex, AIDS, breast cancer awareness, queer reflections on history, the many dimensions of families, freedom songs from oppressed communities of the world, and music by typically under-represented composers (especially women and LesBiGayTrans artists).

In addition to the chorus there is an ensemble, OVation, that is a subset of the One Voice singers who perform in the community and at One Voice's major concerts. Of particular importance is the outreach to schools and youth.

Performance history
Recent appearances include:
 Come Fly With Me: A GLBT Romp Around the World, June 15–16, 2012 at History Theatre St. Paul, Minnesota
 Chorus America Opening Concert, June 13, 2012 at Orchestra Hall Minneapolis, Minnesota
 MPR Harmony in the Park, June 7, 2012 at Minnehaha Park Bandshell Minneapolis, Minnesota
 QMC Concert, June 4, 2012 at Como Park Pavilion St. Paul, Minnesota
 Brave Souls & Dreamers, January 21–22, 2012 at Hopkins High School Minnetonka, Minnesota
 Boom, Bang, Crash, June 10–11, 2011 at Heart of the Beast Puppet and Mask Theater, Minneapolis, Minnesota
 Love Dares Speak Its Name, January 14–15, 2011 at Central Presbyterian Church, St. Paul, Minnesota
 Different is Great- A family Concert, June 4–5, 2010 at Heart of the Beast Puppet and Mask Theater, Minneapolis, Minnesota
 Unsilenced, GLBT and Jewish Voices of the Holocaust, January 30–31, 2010
 Lavender Green: Thinking Globally, Singing Locally, June 13–14, 2009
 Many Lives, One Song: Hope for a World Beyond AIDS, December 5–6, 2008
 GALA Festival VIII in Miami, Florida, Carnival Center for the Performing Arts, July 12–19, 2008
 Old New Borrowed Q: Celebrating 20 years, June 21–22, 2008 Saint Paul, Minnesota
 Uncommon Light: Brahms and the Beauty of Shadow, January 25–26, 2008 Saint Paul, Minnesota
 Outreach Tour to Iowa (Des Moines, Iowa City, Cedar Falls) November 9–11, 2007
 Generations Rock Concert, June 16 & 17, 2007 at the American History Theater Saint Paul, Minnesota
 Reclaiming Faith, In The Spirit Of Justice, January 20–21, 27-28, 2007
 Outreach Tour, Northern Minnesota and Winnipeg Canada, November 10–13, 2006

Membership
Membership is by audition, held twice each year. In addition there are volunteer opportunities available to non-singing members. These members comprise what is called the Fifth Section.

Organization
One Voice Mixed Chorus is a 501(c)3 non-profit organization. It is funded through dues from singing members, donations from individuals and corporations as well as grants.

Jane Ramseyer Miller is the Artistic Director 
Jane is the Artistic Director-in-Residence for GALA Choruses
 Yelton Rhodes Music bio
 American Composers Forum bio

One Voice Mixed Chorus operates under the direction of a board of directors and a number of committees. Committees include marketing, personnel, development, production, membership and diversity, finance and music.

Staff positions include the artistic director, accompanist, executive director, operations coordinator, and the OVation ensemble coach.

Recordings
 BraveSouls & Dreamers, 2012
 Old New Borrowed Q, 2008
 Building Bridges, 2005
 Songs of the Soul, 2000–2004

Associations
 Member of The Gay and Lesbian Association of Choruses (GALA).
 Member of the Queer Music Consortium (QMC).

References

External links 
 
 GALA Choruses

Musical groups from the Twin Cities
Choirs in Minnesota
LGBT choruses
1988 establishments in Minnesota
Musical groups established in 1988